Freddy or Freddie may refer to:

Entertainment
Freddy (comic strip), a newspaper comic strip which ran from 1955 to 1980
Freddie (Cromartie), a character from the Japanese manga seriesCromartie High School
Freddie (dance), a short-lived 1960s dance fad
Freddy (franchise), a franchise that began with A Nightmare on Elm Street
Freddy Krueger, a character from the franchise
Freddie (TV series) a sitcom created by Freddie Prinze, Jr.
Freddy Fazbear, the titular character of Five Nights at Freddy's
Freddie (Freddie Gibbs album), 2018
Freddy, 2022 Indian film starring Kartik Aaryan

People
Freddy (given name), a list of people with Freddy or Freddie as a given name or nickname
Freddie (cricketer), English cricketer and TV personality
Freddie (singer) (born 1990), Hungarian singer
Freddy (Angolan footballer) (born 1979)
Fredesvinda García (1935-1961), Cuban singer known as Freddy

Other uses
Freddy (dog), a Great Dane known for being the world's tallest dog
Freddy (weather), an animated weatherman
Freddy's Frozen Custard & Steakburgers, an American fast-casual restaurant
Atari FREDDIE, a custom chip found in some later Atari 8-bit computers
Freddy (1969-1971) and Freddy II (1973-1976), experimental robots built at the University 
Cyclone Freddy, A long-lasting cyclone that impacted part of Africa

See also
 Freddie Mac, a government-sponsored enterprise of the US federal government, authorized to make loans and loan guarantees
 Fast Freddie (disambiguation), a list of people with the nickname and a video game
 Fred (disambiguation)